Sternfeld's gecko (Ancylodactylus quattuorseriatus) is a species of geckos found in central Africa.

References

Ancylodactylus
Reptiles described in 1912